Martha Jachi Umbulla (10 November 1955 – 20 January 2021) was a Tanzanian politician.

Career 
Umbulla was a member of the National Assembly as a member of the Chama Cha Mapinduzi from 2005 to 2021.

Death 
Umbulla died at HCG Hospital in Mumbai, India in January 2021.

References

See also 

 List of MPs elected in the 2015 Tanzania general election

1955 births
2021 deaths
Tanzanian MPs 2015–2020
21st-century Tanzanian politicians
21st-century Tanzanian women politicians
Chama Cha Mapinduzi MPs